The NSU Sharks Women's Crew team represents Nova Southeastern University in Davie, Florida. They currently compete in the Sunshine State Conference.

History

The first-ever women’s rowing coach at Nova Southeastern University, John Gartin is entering his fourth season at the helm, after guiding the Sharks to its best finish in 2005–06. Under Gartin’s watchful eye, the Sharks set new program and national records becoming the only crew ever to reach the NCAA Division II Women’s Rowing National 
Championships in their first three seasons of competition, and then win two national championships.  As a team, NSU became the first SSC institution to ever finish first in the nation in 2005. The Sharks started the 2006 spring season with a bang, taking home the Lyden Cup at the Rollins Invitational and then winning the Rollins Spring Break races two weeks later. As a team, the Sharks finished second at the Sunshine State Conference Championships after strong finishes by both the varsity 4+ and varsity 8+.  NSU finished the 2005–06 season ranked third in the nation after impressive showings at the Dad Vail Regatta, which included the lightweight 4+ championship,  and the NCAA National Championships. With a 20-member crew in 2005, the Sharks started off the season with an impressive showing at the Stetson Sprints as three of the four NSU crews won their events.  For the season, the Varsity 8+ crew captured five first-place finishes and three second-place finishes, while the Varsity 4+ notched six first place and two second-place finishes.

Season by season results

Rowing, Women
College rowing teams in the United States